Mount Tucker is a distinctive rock mountain mass 9 nautical miles (17 km) northwest of Longing Gap, overlooking Larsen Inlet in Graham Land. It was mapped from surveys by the Falkland Islands Dependencies Survey (FIDS) (1960–61), and was named by the United Kingdom Antarctic Place-Names Committee (UK-APC) after the Tucker Sno-cat Corporation of Medford, Oregon, makers of Sno-cat vehicles.

Mountains of Graham Land
Nordenskjöld Coast